Cognitive appraisal (also called simply 'appraisal') is the subjective interpretation made by an individual to stimuli in the environment. It is a component in a variety of theories relating to stress, mental health, coping, and emotion. It is most notably used in the transactional model of stress and coping, introduced in a 1984 publication by Richard Lazarus and Susan Folkman. In this theory, cognitive appraisal is defined as the way in which an individual responds to and interprets stressors in life. A variety of mental disorders have been observed as having abnormal patterns of cognitive appraisal in those affected by the disorder. Other work has detailed how personality can influence the way in which individuals cognitively appraise a situation.

The reframing of stimuli and experiences, called cognitive reappraisal, has been found "one of the most effective strategies for emotion regulation."

Conceptualizations and theories

Lazarus' transactional model of stress 

This model uses cognitive appraisal as a way to explain responses to stressful events.

According to this theory, two distinct forms of cognitive appraisal must occur in order for an individual to feel stress in response to an event; Lazarus called these stages "primary appraisal" and "secondary appraisal". During primary appraisal, an event is interpreted as dangerous to the individual or threatening to their personal goals. During the secondary appraisal, the individual evaluates their ability or resources to be able to cope with a specific situation .

Scherer's component process model 
The component process model proposed by Klaus Scherer utilizes cognitive appraisal to explain an individual’s psychological and physiological response to situations. Scherer’s model makes additions to the Lazarus’ transactional model regarding how many appraisals occur. Rather than just two levels of appraisal in response to an event (primary and secondary), Scherer’s model suggests four distinct appraisals occur: (a) the direct effects or relevance that an individual perceives an event being to them (b) the consequences an event has both immediately and long-term to an individual and their goals (c) the ability an individual perceives they can cope with the consequences of an event (d) the ways in which the events are perceived to result from an individual’s values and self-concept. This model and additional work by Scherer notably highlights not only psychological responses, but many physiological responses according to how events are appraised by an individual.

Roseman's appraisal theory of emotions 
Ira Roseman utilized the concept of cognitive appraisal to build an explanatory theory that encompasses a wider range of emotions (when compared with Lazarus' transactional model). According to Roseman (1996), positive emotions result from events that an individual appraises as consistent with their motives, while negative emotions result from events that individuals appraise as inconsistent with their motives. More specific emotions are based on if the event is perceived to be as caused by others, the individual, or due to an uncontrollable circumstance.

Strategies 
Cognitive reappraisal is one of the most studied mechanisms of the emotion regulation form referred to as cognitive change. It encompasses a variety of different strategies, such as positive reappraisal (creating and focusing on a positive aspect of the stimulus), decentering (reinterpreting an event by broadening one's perspective to see "the bigger picture"), or fictional reappraisal (adopting or emphasizing the belief that event is not real, that it is for instance "just a movie" or "just my imagination").

Practical applications 
The way in which stress is cognitively appraised has been found to influence mental health. Cognitive styles of perceiving the world and interpreting events have been suggested as factors that may make certain individuals more prone to depression, such as Aaron Beck's cognitive theory (1967). A variety of studies have linked panic disorder with attentional biases and catastrophic perceptions of events.

References 

Psychological stress